Mystrops is a genus of beetles belonging to the family Nitidulidae.

The species of this genus are found in Southern America.

Species:

Mystrops dufaui 
Mystrops insularis

References

Nitidulidae